Joseph Albert "Trey" Hollingsworth III (born September 12, 1983) is an American businessman and politician who served as the U.S. representative for  from 2017 to 2023. A member of the Republican Party, Hollingsworth served on the House of Representatives Financial Services Committee. Due to that committee assignment, Hollingsworth was the vice ranking member of the House Financial Services Committee Subcommittee on Investor Protection, Entrepreneurship, and Capital Markets and a member of the House Financial Services Subcommittee on Diversity and Inclusion.

With a net worth of $50.1 million, Hollingsworth was the 12th-wealthiest member of the 115th Congress. On January 12, 2022, he announced he would not run for reelection in 2022.

Early life and education
Hollingsworth was born in Clinton, Tennessee. He attended the Webb School in Knoxville, Tennessee, and the University of Pennsylvania, graduating from the Wharton School. After graduating from Wharton, Hollingsworth founded Hollingsworth Capital Partners with his father, Joe Hollingsworth Jr. The company specialized in rebuilding old manufacturing sites and returning them to service. He also founded an aluminum remanufacturing company.

U.S. House of Representatives

Elections

2016 campaign 
Running in the Republican Party primary election against Indiana Attorney General Greg Zoeller and State Senators Erin Houchin and Brent Waltz, Hollingsworth won with 34% of the vote. He defeated Democratic nominee Shelli Yoder in the November general election with 54% of the vote.

2018 campaign 
Hollingsworth defeated Democratic nominee Liz Watson in 2018, 59% to 41%. Watson was endorsed by Elizabeth Warren. In 2019, she moved to Washington, D.C., to lead the Congressional Progressive Caucus Center.

2020 campaign 
Hollingsworth won his third term representing Indiana's 9th Congressional District in 2020 against challengers Andy Ruff, a Democrat, and Libertarian Tonya Millis, with over 61% of the vote.

"I’m honored to serve a third term in the U.S. House of Representatives, working alongside Hoosiers every day to fight for certainty and prosperity during these uncertain times", Hollingsworth wrote in a news release. "Since you first elected me, we have worked together to make sure our voices are heard in Washington, to support policies that put American families first, and to expand opportunities for Hoosiers to succeed. Now is not the time to back down from the fight for our values, and I look forward to working together for another two years."

Tenure
Hollingsworth was sworn into his first term on January 3, 2017, his second term on January 3, 2019, and his third term on January 3, 2021. He has promised to serve no more than eight years (four terms) in the House.

Government reform, including creating Congressional term limits, has been a priority of Hollingsworth's. In the 115th, 116th, and 117th Congresses, his first bill introduced was a resolution to amend the Constitution to impose term limits on Congressional lawmakers. The measure would limit Congressional terms to four in the House of Representatives and two in the Senate.

Hollingsworth has also attempted to implement a lobbying ban for members of Congress. In the 115th, 116th, and 117th Congresses, he introduced the Banning Lobbying and Safeguarding Trust Act, which would ban members of Congress from ever registering as lobbyists.

Hollingsworth has voted against all short-term spending bills and believes short-term budgeting is a failure of process and waste of taxpayer dollars.

As of January 2022, Hollingsworth has voted in line with President Biden's stated position roughly 18% of the time.

Committee assignment
Committee on Financial Services
Subcommittee on Investor Protection, Entrepreneurship, and Capital Markets
Subcommittee on Housing, Community Development, and Insurance

Hollingsworth had served on the House Financial Services Committee since taking office in 2017 and has been active in financial services policy.

Capital markets

116th United States Congress 
In 2019, Hollingsworth introduced the Senior Security Act, which aims to protect senior citizen investors from financial fraud and abuse. Also in 2019, he introduced a bipartisan bill, the Fannie Mae and Freddie Mac Lobbying Regulation Act, to ban government-sponsored enterprises officials, including Fannie Mae and Freddie Mac, from lobbying members of Congress.

Fintech/digital assets

117th United States Congress 
In 2022, Hollingsworth and Josh Gottheimer led a bipartisan letter to the United States Department of the Treasury asking for more information about Tether's exposure to foreign assets.

Political positions

Agriculture 
Hollingsworth introduced the Livestock Protection Act to protect farmer's livestock from predatory black vultures after local farmers brought the issue to his attention during a town hall. In the 115th Congress, Hollingsworth voted for the 2018 Farm Bill to fund and update the Department of Agriculture.

Government reform 
Hollingsworth has advocated for Congressional term limits and has promised to serve no more than eight years (four terms) in the House. In the 115th, 116th, and 117th Congresses, the first bill he introduced was a resolution to amend the Constitution to impose term limits on Congressional lawmakers. The measure would limit Congressional terms to four in the House and two in the Senate.

Hollingsworth has also proposed a lobbying ban for members of Congress. He has introduced the Banning Lobbying and Safeguarding Trust Act, which would ban members of Congress from ever registering as a lobbyist.

COVID-19 pandemic
In April 2020, during the COVID-19 pandemic, Hollingsworth said he favored ending stay-at-home orders so as to reopen the economy. "The social scientists are telling us about the economic disaster that is going on", he said. "Our GDP is supposed to be down 20% alone this quarter. It is policymakers' decision to put on our big boy and big girl pants and say [more deaths] is the lesser of these two evils. It is not zero evil, but it is the lesser of these two evils and we intend to move forward that direction. That is our responsibility and to abdicate that is to insult the Americans that voted us into office." A statement provided by his office later that day said, "It's hyperbolic to say that the only choices before us are the two corner solutions: no economy or widespread casualties. We can use the best of biology and economics to enable as much of the economy to operate as possible while we work to minimize disease transmission."

Health care
Hollingsworth supports the repeal and replacement of the Affordable Care Act (Obamacare). He considers the act government overreach that impedes innovation by health care companies.

Immigration
On June 27, 2019, Hollingsworth voted to appropriate $4.6 billion in emergency funding to agencies for immigration-related activities.

Taxation
In December 2017, Hollingsworth voted for the Tax Cuts and Jobs Act of 2017.

Yemen
Hollingsworth voted for three resolutions in the House of Representatives disapproving of President Trump's arms sales to Saudi Arabia and the UAE.

2020 election results
In December 2020, Hollingsworth was one of 126 Republican members of the House of Representatives to sign an amicus brief in support of Texas v. Pennsylvania, a lawsuit filed at the United States Supreme Court contesting certain voting procedures during the 2020 presidential election. The Supreme Court declined to hear the case on the basis that Texas lacked standing under Article III of the Constitution to challenge the results of an election held by another state.

House Speaker Nancy Pelosi issued a statement that called signing the amicus brief an act of "election subversion." She also reprimanded the House members, including Hollingsworth, who supported the lawsuit: "The 126 Republican Members that signed onto this lawsuit brought dishonor to the House. Instead of upholding their oath to support and defend the Constitution, they chose to subvert the Constitution and undermine public trust in our sacred democratic institutions."

January 6, 2021 commission
On May 19, 2021, Hollingsworth was one of 35 Republicans who joined all Democrats in voting to approve legislation to establish the bipartisan January 6, 2021 commission meant to investigate the storming of the U.S. Capitol.

Veterans 
In the 116th and 117th Congresses, Hollingsworth introduced the Investing in Veteran Entrepreneurial Talents (VETs) Act to support service-disabled veteran-owned small businesses. He drafted the act in consultation with service-disabled veterans. Hollingsworth first introduced the act in November 2020. The original version included a certification protocol modification that was adopted in the 2021 National Defense Authorization Act, which Hollingsworth supported.

Law enforcement 
Hollingsworth is a staunch supporter of law enforcement officers. He authored the Protecting Officers of the Law In Civilian Establishments (POLICE) Act to allow federal law enforcement officers to enter federal property armed. This bill stemmed from a call with Floyd County, Indiana Sheriff Frank Loop, who shared his officers' stories with Hollingsworth.

International issues

Trade 
Hollingsworth requested that the U.S. Department of Commerce lift its Section 232 restrictions on POSCO Steel, a Korean steel company with a facility in Jeffersonville, Indiana.

Social issues

Abortion 
Hollingsworth has a staunch anti-abortion voting record. He has repeatedly voted against taxpayer-funded abortion and has repeatedly co-sponsored the Pain-Capable Unborn Child Protection Act, Born-Alive Abortion Survivors Protections Act, and other pieces of anti-abortion legislation.

Transgender rights 
Hollingsworth voted to disapprove of President Trump's policy to ban transgender people from openly serving in the military, saying, "the honor of serving our country and protecting American freedoms should be open to anyone who can pass the physical, psychological, and medical exams."

Electoral history

Personal life
Hollingsworth was born in Clinton, Tennessee. He attended the Webb School in Knoxville, Tennessee, and the University of Pennsylvania, graduating from the Wharton School in three years in 2004. He received his Master's in public policy from Georgetown University in 2014.

Shortly after graduating from Wharton, Hollingsworth founded Hollingsworth Capital Partners, specializing in renovating and rebuilding old manufacturing sites and returning them to service. It operates over 11 million square feet. In 2008, INC magazine ranked the firm the 12th fastest growing private company in the country.

Hollingsworth also founded an aluminum remanufacturing company that had produced over 1.8 billion pounds of aluminum before Hollingsworth and partners sold it.

Hollingsworth married Kelly Francis in 2014. They have a son, Joseph, born in 2017. They reside in Jeffersonville, Indiana, a few miles from where Kelly was born and raised and her family still resides.

References

External links

 
 
 

|-

1983 births
21st-century American politicians
Living people
People from Clinton, Tennessee
Republican Party members of the United States House of Representatives from Indiana
Wharton School of the University of Pennsylvania alumni